Kaisa Korhonen (born 20 July 1941) is a Finnish singer, actor, theatre director and writer. She was a central figure in the Finnish leftist music scene of the 60s and 70s, appearing both as a solo artist, and with KOM-teatteri. After her singing career, Korhonen has become an accomplished director and teacher of theatre directing.

Career
Korhonen studied scenography at the Taideteollinen oppilaitos (now Aalto University School of Arts, Design and Architecture) between 1961 and 1965.

Korhonen had first started singing in public in 1962, but her career as a vocalist really began in the spring of 1964, with performances at the Lilla Teatern in Helsinki. At the time, she also starred in the Orvokit series of political cabarets, which aired on the radio between 1965 and 1966. Korhonen has become especially known for her interpretations of Kaj Chydenius' songs.

Korhonen's style is marked by her loud, even shouting expression. Her singing became a symbol of the rise of leftist politics in the 60s, and especially the Taistoist movement of the 70s. Societal reactions to her singing were thus split, as conservatives objected both to the songs' messages, and her passionate delivery.

In 1965, Korhonen was named leader of the Helsinki Ylioppilasteatteri. In her work as director, she was inspired by Bertolt Brecht, whose plays she had seen when she visited East Berlin in 1962. Her first stage production was Brecht's A Respectable Wedding; this production went on to win an award at a student theatre festival in Nancy. Here Korhonen also directed her then-husband Kaj Chydenius' Lapualaisooppera in 1966. Korhonen remained at the Ylioppilasteatteri until 1967.

Korhonen briefly directed the Swedish Theatre's KOM-scenen, before co-founding the independent KOM-teatteri, acting as both director and actor. This travelling theatre company aimed to thus reach audiences not accustomed to theatre as an art form. KOM-teatteri also released two musical records: Porvari Nukkuu Huonosti and Kansainvälinen

In 1972, Korhonen moved on to become a teacher of directing at the Suomen Teatterikoulu (now the Helsinki Theatre Academy). Here she stayed until 1977.

From 1981 to 1984, Korhonen was the leader of the Swedish-speaking Lille Teatern. Afterwards, she became a professor of acting at Tampere University, where she remained for five years. In 1989, Korhonen co-founded and subsequently directed the Musta Rakkaus theatre company at the Tampere Theatre.

After finishing with Musta Rakkaus in 1992, Korhonen proceeded to take a year-long temporary professorship at the Theatre Academy, before becoming director of the Helsinki City Theatre for a two-year term. In 1995, she then returned to teaching directing at the Theatre Academy – this time as a professor – for another five years. Between 2002 and 2004, Korhonen worked as guest professor at the Swedish Institute of Dramatic Art.

Since 2007, Korhonen has worked as a freelance director. Between 2007 and 2009, she received an art professorship, a kind of prestigious grant, from the Finnish state. In total, she has directed more than 100 plays.

Personal life
Korhonen was born in Sotkamo in 1941 to provost Kusti Vihtori Korhonen and his wife, Kirsti Johanna Korhonen. The family moved to Helsinki in 1957.

In 1965 she married composer Kaj Chydenius. They had two children, Kalle and Jussi Chydenius, born in 1970 and 1972, respectively. Jussi Chydenius is a member of the a capella group Rajaton. They divorced in 1980.

In 1991, Korhonen married actor Matti Tapio Rasila.

Awards and accolades
Art Prize of the Student Union of the University of Helsinki, 1966
Eino Leino Prize, 1974
, 1980
Pro Finlandia, 1990
Finnish Theatre Directors' Union (member of Trade Union for Theatre and Media) Insignia, 1998
, 2000
Central Union of Finnish Theatre Organizations Golden decoration, 2001
Finnish Theatre Directors' Union  Golden insignia, 2007
Honorary Doctor of Theatre Arts at the Theatre Academy, 2009
Life's Work Award, 2012

Discography

Solo albums
Kaisa Korhonen (1969)
Työstä Ja Taistelusta (1970)
Maamme Lauluja (1977)
Elämäni Laulut (Compilation, 1993)

KOM-teatteri
Porvari Nukku Huonosti (1971)
Kansainvälinen (1972)

Bibliography
Enemmän kuin totta hetken aikaa : Kaisa Korhonen, Kalle Holmberg ja Pekka Milonoff keskustelevat ohjaajantyöstä (1977)
Uhma, vimma, kaipaus : muistiinpanoja työstä ja elämästä (1993)
Koirien ajama kettu : ohjaustaiteen kysymyksiä (editor, 1998)
Näytös vailla loppua (editor with K. Tanskanen, 2005)
Theatre People – People's Theatre (editor with K. Tanskanen, 2006)
Näytöksen paikka : suomalaisen teatterin vuosi 2007 (editor with J. Lahtinen, 2007)
Kiihottavasti totta (with H.-L. Helavuori, 2008)
Människan som skådeplats (with H.-L. Helavuori, 20012)

References

External links
Kaisa Korhonen on Discogs
Kaisa Korhonen on IMDb

1941 births
Living people
People from Sotkamo
Writers from Kainuu
Recipients of the Eino Leino Prize
Academic staff of the University of Tampere
Finnish women academics
20th-century Finnish women singers